Tomahawk Lake may refer to:

Canada
Tomahawk Lake (Halifax), in Nova Scotia
Tomahawk Lake (Kings), in Nova Scotia

United States
Tomahawk Lake (New York)
Tomahawk Lake (Wisconsin)